Pyjon is a surname. Notable people with the surname include:

 John Pyjon (fl. 1350s), English politician
 Roger Pyjon (fl. 1388), English politician